Pollokshields railway station was a railway station in Pollokshields, a district of Glasgow, Scotland. The station was originally part of the Glasgow and Paisley Joint Railway. It was opened in 1840 and amalgamated into the neighbouring Shields Road station in 1925.

History
Sources published in the late 20th century claim that Pollokshields station opened on 14 July 1840. 
Contemporary 19th century sources would suggest however that both Pollokshields station and Shields Road station were created as part of the general reorganisation of rail links between Paisley and Glasgow in the 1870s, in preparation for the opening of St Enoch station and Glasgow Central station. The adjacent Shields station was developed around the time that the Paisley Canal Line opened in 1885.

Pollokshields station amalgamated with Shields Road station and Shields station on 1 April 1925, creating a larger Shields Road station. This combined station was located within the complex of lines forming Shields Junction. In 2007, part of the platforms where the City of Glasgow Union Railway and the Glasgow and Paisley Joint Railway crossed over the former General Terminus and Glasgow Harbour Railway are still visible.

See also
 Pollokshields East railway station
 Pollokshields West railway station

References

Notes

Sources

External links 
Photographs and historical maps of Shields Junction, Glasgow, before and after the building of the stations

Disused railway stations in Glasgow
Former Glasgow and Paisley Joint Railway stations
Railway stations in Great Britain opened in 1840
Pollokshields